Ambystoma talpoideum, the mole salamander, is a species of salamander found in much of the eastern and central United States, from Florida to Texas, north to Illinois, east to Kentucky, with isolated populations in Virginia and Indiana. Older sources often refer to this species as the tadpole salamander because some individuals remain in a neotenic state. This salamander lives among the leaf litter on the forest floor, migrating to ponds to breed.

Description 
Mole salamanders are stocky, with short bodies and large heads. They can grow to 10 cm (4 in) in length. They are normally gray or dark brown in color, with darker mottling and lighter gray undersides.  Males can be distinguished by the presence of a swollen cloaca. Larvae and paedomorphic adults are aquatic and have large feathery gills. A. talpoideum can be distinguished from other salamander larvae by the presence of two light stripes on their underside

Distribution and habitat
Mole salamanders are found in south eastern lowland areas of the Gulf Coastal Plains of the United States. Their main range extends from eastern Texas to southern South Carolina and inland as far as southern Illinois. It is absent from southern Florida and Louisiana, and there are separate populations in Kentucky, Virginia, Tennessee, North Carolina, northern South Carolina, northern Georgia and northern Alabama. There is also a small isolated population within the southernmost tip of Indiana. They inhabit floodplain pine or broadleaf forests, especially near gum and cypress ponds. Adults live under the surface of leaf litter while larvae are aquatic and found in ponds and ephemeral, fish-free waters.

Behavior 

Primarily nocturnal, the mole salamander is found in habitats of moist forest debris, usually near a permanent source of water. The eggs are laid in the spring, during heavy rains. Some larvae undergo metamorphosis while others are neotenic and retain their gills. In larger bodies of water where predatory fish like the bluegill (Lepomis macrochirus) are present, metamorphosis is more common. When attacked, adults and juveniles lower their heads to expose their parotoid glands which exude a noxious secretion. This salamander is an opportunistic feeder, eating almost anything smaller than itself which it can overpower, including various arthropods and tadpoles. It has been revealed that A. talpoideum's diet consists almost completely of various arthropods and only a small number of other Ambystomatidae larvae.

Conservation
In its Red List of Threatened Species, the IUCN lists Ambystoma talpoideum as being "Least Concern" because the population trend is stable. Threats to this species include destruction of forest ponds and swamp habitat, the filling in or deepening of breeding ponds, and the introduction of predatory fish. In Indiana, the mole salamander is listed as an endangered species.

References 

Amphibian Species of the World: Ambystoma talpoideum
University of Georgia: Mole salamander
Illinois Natural History Survey: Ambystoma talpoideum

Mole salamanders
Amphibians described in 1838